Vahid Mirzadeh (born December 28, 1986, in Lake Worth, Florida) is an American tennis player.

Mirzadeh was a wildcard entrant at the 2014 US Open in the doubles event, where he partnered Philip Simmonds, but they lost in the first round to Brian Baker and Rajeev Ram 2–6, 3–6.

Mirzadeh made his ATP main draw debut at the 2014 Delray Beach International Tennis Championships in the doubles event partnering Sekou Bangoura. The pair had only made through the doubles draw as an alternate team but in the first round they defeated the 2nd seeds Eric Butorac and Raven Klaasen 7–5, 3–6, [10–5]. However, their run came to an end in the quarterfinals, which they lost to Sam Groth and Max Mirnyi 6–7(5–7), 4–6.

External links

1986 births
Living people
American male tennis players
People from Lake Worth Beach, Florida
American people of Iranian descent
People from Wellington, Florida
Florida State Seminoles men's tennis players
Tennis people from Florida